The Asian Amateur Boxing Championships is the highest competition for boxing amateurs in Asia. The first tournament took place in 1963, hosted by Bangkok, Thailand.

Men's editions

Women's editions

Combined editions

All-time medal table

Women
As of 2015

See also
 Boxing at the Asian Games

Results Database
 http://amateur-boxing.strefa.pl/Championships/AAAChampionships.html

External links   
Amateur-boxing.strefa.pl -The results
Men results
Women results
2015 Women results1
2015 Women results2

 
Boxing
Boxing competitions in Asia
Amateur boxing
Boxing competitions
Recurring sporting events established in 1963